Eupithecia extrinseca is a moth in the family Geometridae. It is found in China (Shensi).

References

Moths described in 1978
extrinseca
Moths of Asia